The 1921 Hamburg state election was held on 20 February 1921 to elect the 160 members of the Hamburg Parliament.

Results

References 

1921 elections in Germany
1921
February 1921 events in Europe